Aristofusus stegeri, common name the ornamented spindle, is a species of sea snail, a marine gastropod mollusk in the family Fasciolariidae, the spindle snails, the tulip snails and their allies.

Description

Distribution
This species occurs in the Gulf of Mexico off Florida.

References

 Vermeij G.J. & Snyder M.A. (2018). Proposed genus-level classification of large species of Fusininae (Gastropoda, Fasciolariidae). Basteria. 82(4-6): 57-82.

External links
  Lyons, W.G. (1978), Fusinus stegeri (Gastropoda: Fasciolaridae), a new species from the eastern Gulf of Mexico; Nautilus 92(2): 85-88

stegeri
Gastropods described in 1978